Ziba Dexter Scott (1846–1922) was a socialist politician and activist in the Dakota Territory and later the United States state of South Dakota.

In 1887, Scott was serving as the treasurer of Grant County, South Dakota. He served in the South Dakota State Senate from 1891 to 1892. Representing the 31st district, encompassing Grant County and Roberts County in the second legislative session since statehood, Scott sat in the state senate as an independent and during his term resided in Wilmot, in Roberts County. Scott, along with another independent, played a role in an effort to get fellow state senator of the 33rd district, James H. Kyle, of the Populist Party, elected to the United States Senate in 1891.

He attempted to return to the state senate in 1894, a candidate under the populist banner for Beadle County. He was endorsed by the Beadle County Independents' Central Committee.<ref>"Huronitems", The Daily Huronite", Thursday, July 12, 1894, Huron, South Dakota, United States Of America</ref>  A newspaper column at the time, entitled "Great Scott!" commented:

Scott's candidacy was eventually unsuccessful. At the time, Scott was residing in Huron, South Dakota. He also maintained a farm in Grant County. In 1895, Scott was living in Mississippi, on land he had purchased near the Gulf of Mexico (near Biloxi). Another newspaper column, again titled "Great Scott!", also in The Daily Huronite at the time noted that Scott has "established a co-operative colony" there with "a few others of socialistic proclivities" would "live on fish and oysters and dream dreams".

Z. D. Scott was one of the original founders, an active member, lecturer and treasurer of the Dakota Farmers' Alliance. He resided in Milbank, Dakota Territory during the late 1880s."Huronitems", The Daily Huronite, Friday, July 19, 1889, Huron, South Dakota, United States Of America By 1892, Scott was also the president of the Alliance Hail Association, an association providing hail damage insurance to farmers."ALLIANCE HAIL ASSOCIATION", The Daily Huronite, Thursday, April 28, 1892, Huron, South Dakota, United States Of America He was also a member and organizer of the Milbank Knights of Labor."The Knights of Labor", The Daily Huronite, Wednesday, June 19, 1889, Huron, South Dakota, United States Of America Scott, also a notable writer, also wrote articles for The Watertown Public Opinion in Watertown, South Dakota.

Scott is remembered presently mainly on the basis of his socialist political beliefs at the time. An 1897 article in The Aberdeen Daily News'' lauded Scott as an "erstwhile tireless exponent" of socialism "who had the courage to put his convictions to the test". The same article also gave recognition to Scott's service to the Dakota Farmers' Alliance, describing him as a "tireless worker for  success, directing much of his time to increasing its membership and spreading its usefulness." A 1993 publication described that Scott was "held in high esteem" across the Dakota Territory at the time, and had become one of the leading figures for the co-operative commonwealth movement of the time.

See also

 David Handley

References

South Dakota state senators
South Dakota Independents
Writers from South Dakota
1846 births
1922 deaths
People from Huron, South Dakota
People from Milbank, South Dakota